Chioselia Mare is a commune in Cahul District, Moldova. It is composed of two villages, Chioselia Mare and Frumușica.

Notable people
 Ștefan Secăreanu

References

Communes of Cahul District